Zuo Zongtang, Marquis Kejing (also spelled Tso Tsung-t'ang; ; November 10, 1812 – September 5, 1885), sometimes referred to as General Tso, was a Chinese statesman and military leader of the late Qing dynasty.

Born in Xiangyin County, Hunan Province, Zuo sat for the imperial examination in his youth but obtained only a juren degree. He then spent his time studying agriculture, geography and military strategy. In 1851, he started his career in the Qing military by participating in the campaign against the Taiping Rebellion. In 1862, he was recommended by Zeng Guofan to serve as the provincial governor of Zhejiang Province. During his term, he coordinated Qing forces to attack the Taiping rebels with support from British and French forces. For this success, he was promoted to Viceroy of Min-Zhe. After capturing Hangzhou from the Taiping rebels in 1864, he was enfeoffed as a first class count. In 1866, as part of the Qing government's Self-Strengthening Movement, Zuo oversaw the construction of the Fuzhou Arsenal and naval academy. That same year, he was reassigned to serve as the Viceroy of Shaan-Gan, where he oversaw industrialization in Gansu Province. In 1867, he was appointed as an Imperial Commissioner in charge of military affairs in Gansu.

During his term as Imperial Commissioner in Gansu, he participated in the suppression of the Nian Rebellion. In 1875, he was appointed Imperial Commissioner again to supervise military action against the Dungan Revolt. By the late 1870s, he had crushed the Dungan Revolt and recaptured Xinjiang Province from rebel forces. In 1875, the Guangxu Emperor made an extraordinary exception by awarding Zuo a jinshi degree – even though Zuo never achieved this in the imperial examination – and appointing him to the Hanlin Academy. In 1878, in recognition of his achievements, Zuo was promoted from a first class count to a second class marquis. He was reassigned to serve as the Viceroy of Liangjiang in 1881 and appointed to the Grand Council in 1884, before being made an Imperial Commissioner again to oversee naval affairs. He died in 1885 in Fuzhou, Fujian Province, and was given the posthumous name Wenxiang.

While Zuo is best known outside China for his military exploits, he also made contributions to Chinese agricultural science and education. In particular, he promoted cotton cultivation to northwestern China as a replacement for cash crop opium and established a large-scale modern press in Shaanxi and Gansu provinces which published Confucian classics and newer works on agricultural science.

The dish General Tso's chicken in American Chinese cuisine was named after Zuo, though there is no recorded connection between him and the meal.

Names
Zuo Zongtang's family name was Zuo and his given name was Zongtang. His courtesy name was Jigao or Cun. His art name (or pseudonym) was Xiangshang Nongren, which means "peasant from Xiang". He often signed off by the name Jinliang, which means "(Zhuge) Liang of today", since he liked to compare himself with Zhuge Liang.

The titles of nobility he held were First Class Count Kejing from 1864 to 1878, and Second Class Marquis Kejing from 1878 to his death in 1885. Zuo's posthumous name, granted by the Qing imperial court, was Wenxiang.

Zuo was nicknamed "Zuo Luozi" ("Zuo the mule") for his stubbornness.

Biography

Early life 
Zuo was born in 1812 in a land-holding family in Xiangyin County, Hunan Province. His family paid for him to attend a local private school starting from the age of five, where he mastered the Confucian classics. At the age of 20, he qualified to attend the Imperial Academy.

Zuo's career got an inauspicious start when, in his youth, he failed the imperial examination seven times (ca. 1822–1835). He decided to abandon his plans to become an official and returned to his home by the Xiang River to farm silkworms, read, and drink tea. It was during this period that he first directed his attention to the study of Western sciences and political economy.

Taiping Rebellion
When the Taiping Rebellion broke out in 1850, Zuo, then 38 years old, was hired as an advisor to Zeng Guofan, the governor of Hunan. In 1856, he was formally offered a position in the provincial government of Hunan. In 1860, Zuo was given command of a force of 5,000 volunteers, the Xiang Army (later known as "Chu Army"), and by September of that year, he drove the Taiping rebels out of Hunan and Guangxi provinces, into coastal Zhejiang Province. Zuo captured the city of Shaoxing and, from there, pushed south into Fujian and Guangdong provinces, where the revolt had first begun. In 1863, Zuo was appointed Provincial Governor of Zhejiang and an Undersecretary of War.

In August 1864, Zuo, together with Zeng Guofan, dethroned the Taiping Heavenly Kingdom's teenage ruler, Hong Tianguifu, and brought an end to the rebellion. He was created "First Class Count Kejing" for his part in suppressing the rebellion. He, Zeng Guofan and Li Hongzhang were called Zeng, Zuo, Li, the leaders in suppressing the rebellion.

In 1865, Zuo was appointed Viceroy and Governor-General of Fujian and Zhejiang. As Commissioner of Naval Industries, Zuo founded China's first modern shipyard and naval academy in Fuzhou the following year.

Success and appointments 

Zuo's successes continued. In 1867, he became Viceroy of Shaanxi and Gansu provinces and Imperial Commissioner of the armed forces in Shaanxi. In 1884, his fellow Xiang Army officer, Liu Jintang, was appointed as the first governor of Xinjiang Province. The Governor of Xinjiang was the subordinate to the Viceroy of Shaanxi and Gansu.

In these capacities, Zuo succeeded in putting down another uprising, the Nian Rebellion, in 1868.

After this military success, Zuo marched west with his army of 120,000, winning many victories with advanced Western weapons in the Dungan Revolt in northwestern China (Shaanxi, Ningxia, Gansu, Qinghai and Xinjiang provinces) in the 1870s.

Several Hui Muslim generals, such as Ma Zhan'ao, Ma Anliang, Ma Qianling, Dong Fuxiang, and Ma Haiyan from Hezhou, who had defected to Zuo's army, helped him crush the "Muslim rebels". Zuo rewarded them by relocating the Han Chinese from the suburbs of Hezhou to another place and allowing their troops to stay in the Hezhou suburbs as long as they did not live in the city itself.

In 1878, Zuo successfully suppressed Yakub Beg's uprising and helped to negotiate an end to Russian occupation of the border city of Ili. He was vocal in the debate at the Qing imperial court over what to do with the Xinjiang situation, advocating for Xinjiang to become a province, in opposition to Li Hongzhang, who wanted to abandon what he called "useless Xinjiang" and concentrate on defending China's coastal areas. However, Zuo won the debate, Xinjiang was made a province, and many administrative functions were staffed by his Hunan officers.

Zuo was outspoken in calling for war against the Russian Empire, hoping to settle the matter by attacking Russian forces in Xinjiang with his Xiang Army. In 1878, when tension increased in Xinjiang, Zuo massed Qing forces toward the Russian-occupied Kuldja. The Canadian Spectator stated in 1878, "News from Turkestan says the Chinese are concentrating against Kuldja, a post in Kashgar occupied by the Russians... It is reported that a Russian expedition from Yart Vernaic has been fired upon by Chinese troops and forced to return." The Russians were afraid of the Qing forces, thousands of whom were armed with modern weapons and trained by European officers. Because the Russian forces near the Qing Empire's border were under-manned and under-equipped, they agreed to negotiate.

Zuo's troops were armed with modern German Dreyse needle rifles and Krupp artillery as well as experimental weapons.

For his contributions to his nation and monarch, Zuo was appointed a Grand Secretary to the Grand Secretariat in 1874 and elevated to "Second Class Marquis Kejing" in 1878.

Later life and death
Zuo was appointed to the Grand Council, the cabinet of the Qing Empire at the time, in 1880. Uneasy with bureaucratic politics, Zuo asked to be relieved of his duties and was appointed Viceroy of Liangjiang in 1881. In 1884, upon the outbreak of the Sino-French War, Zuo received his fourth and last commission as commander-in-chief and Imperial Commissioner of the military and Inspector-General overseeing coastal defences in Fujian Province.

Legacy

Zuo was admired by many generals who came after him. During the Republican era, the Kuomintang general Bai Chongxi wanted to reconquer Xinjiang for the Nationalist government, in Zuo's style, and expelled Russian influence from the area. Zuo was also referred to by Kuomintang general Ma Zhongying (a descendant of a Salar noble) as one of his models, as Ma led the National Revolutionary Army's 36th Division to reconquer Xinjiang for the Nationalist government from the pro-Soviet governor Jin Shuren during the Kumul Rebellion.

While Zuo is best known for his military acumen, he believed that the key to peace and stability lay in an educated, prosperous citizenry. He sometimes referred to himself by his art name, "peasant from Xiang", and was keenly interested in agriculture. He advocated the scientific reform of commercial agriculture both as a way to strengthen China's economic self-sufficiency and also as a way to manage civilian populations by improving their standard of living and controlling the kinds of crops they grew. During the 12 years he spent in northwestern China, he undertook extensive agricultural research on different crops and methods. Comparing the benefits and indications of two ancient agricultural methods, the more established long field, crop rotation method and the less common intensive, small-field method, Zuo believed that the latter method, cultivating small fields of densely-planted monocultures, was more suitable to the dry, extreme climate of the northwest region. To promote this method, he authored two pamphlets explaining the method which were then distributed freely to local farming communities. Zuo also recognised the threat of opium to the nation's stability and economic health and advocated replacing opium poppies with cotton as the major cash crop in Gansu and Shaanxi provinces. He authorised the large scale distribution of cotton seeds and published pamphlets on its cultivation and processing. In 1878, he also oversaw the establishment of a large weaving factory in present-day Mulan County, Gansu Province, with the aim of creating a new textile industry in the region and providing socially-acceptable employment to women.

In addition to managing the peasantry by improving their economic circumstances, Zuo also believed that increasing access to traditional Chinese philosophy would help to pacify areas experiencing unrest and ultimately create a more contented and unified populace. To this end, Zuo set up a printing press in northwestern China which printed Chinese classics, as well as agricultural pamphlets. When Zuo first arrived in the region, a decade of constant warfare had virtually stopped all publishing in the region. Zuo prioritised reestablishing the printing industry a priority and thousands of copies of the publications he authorised were distributed in Ningxia, Qinghai, Gansu, Shaanxi and Xinjiang. Printing appears to have stopped when Zuo returned to Beijing, but the endeavour is credited with inspiring later printing presses.

Family

Zuo's great-grandparents were Zuo Fengsheng and Madam Jiang. His grandparents were Zuo Renjin and Madam Yang. His parents were Zuo Guanlan (1778–1830) and Madam Yu (1775–1827).

Zuo had two elder brothers: Zuo Zongyu (1799–1823) and Zuo Zongzhi (1804–1872).

In 1832, Zuo married Zhou Yiduan (1812–1870), a woman from Paitou Township, Xiangtan County in Hunan Province. Zhou's courtesy name was "Junxin". They had four daughters and four sons as follows:
 Zuo Xiaoyu (1833–?), courtesy name Shenjuan, Zuo's first daughter. She married Tao Zhu's son, Tao Guang. She wrote Shi Shiwu Shicao.
 Zuo Xiaoqi (1834–1873), courtesy name Jingzhai, Zuo's second daughter. She wrote Yilan Shi Shicao.
 Zuo Xiaolin (1837–?), courtesy name Xiangju, Zuo's third daughter. She married Li Fuchang from Xiangtan County. She wrote Qionghua Ge Shicao.
 Zuo Xiaobin (1837–?), courtesy name Shaohua, Zuo's fourth daughter. She married Zhou Yibiao from Xiangtan County. She wrote Dan Ru Zhai Yishi.
 Zuo Xiaowei (1846–1873), courtesy name Zizhong, Zuo's first son.
 Zuo Xiaokuan (1847–?), Zuo's second son.
 Zuo Xiaoxun (1853–?), Zuo's third son.
 Zuo Xiaotong (1857–1924), courtesy name Ziyi, Zuo's fourth son.

General Tso's chicken

The dish General Tso's chicken in American Chinese cuisine was introduced in New York in the 1970s, inspired by a dish originally prepared by Peng Chang-kuei, a Taiwanese chef specialising in Hunan cuisine. Peng named the dish in honour of Zuo Zongtang.

One charming story, for which no evidence is offered, credits the Chinese and Southeast Asian stuffed pancake Apam balik to the general. He is said to have invented it as a way to use local products and save his men from more expensive ingredients.

See also 

 Tomb of Zuo Zongtang
 Taiping Rebellion
 Dungan Revolt (1862–77)
 Xinjiang under Qing rule
 Qing reconquest of Xinjiang

References

Citations

Sources

External links 
 

 
1812 births
1885 deaths
Generals from Hunan
Grand Councillors of the Qing dynasty
Grand Secretaries of the Qing dynasty
Assistant Grand Secretaries
Politicians from Yueyang
Political office-holders in Fujian
Political office-holders in Jiangsu
Political office-holders in Shaanxi
Political office-holders in Zhejiang
Qing dynasty generals
Qing dynasty politicians from Hunan
Burials in Changsha
Chinese nobility
Viceroys of Min-Zhe
Viceroys of Shaan-Gan
Viceroys of Liangjiang
Xiang Army personnel
Naval history of China
Ministers of Zongli Yamen